"Higher" is the fifth single from English singer-songwriter Taio Cruz's second studio album, Rokstarr. It was written and produced by Cruz and Sandy Vee, and was released on 26 November 2010. This song was originally written for Australian singer Kylie Minogue's album Aphrodite, but plans fell through. However, Cruz and Minogue recorded a version of the song for the European release, while American rapper Travie McCoy recorded guest raps for the American release. The Brazilian and United Kingdom versions have parts of McCoy's rap mixed into the Minogue version. The version on Cruz's albums feature a solo vocal by Cruz with no guest vocalist and an edited version of the solo version was added to Radio Disney's playlist.

Live performances
On 30 October 2010, Cruz and Minogue appeared on Starfloor and performed the song as a new single. Cruz and McCoy performed the song on Z100's Jingle Ball 2010 on 16 December 2010. Cruz and Kimberly Wyatt performed the song on ITV's Daybreak on 14 February 2011 and on BBC's Let's Dance for Comic Relief on 19 February 2011. Also in February 2011, Cruz appeared on T4 with Jade Ewen, who filled in for Minogue as she was unavailable for the show. On 20 November 2011, Christina Grimmie performed at the 39th American Music Awards of 2011 pre-show alongside Taio Cruz in a special rendition of "Higher".

Music video
The European video, featuring Cruz and Minogue, was directed by Alex Herron and released 19 November 2010. The United States version, featuring McCoy, was released the same day. Both versions feature Cruz and either Minogue or McCoy in an underground warehouse with a live band.

Chart performance
"Higher" debuted on the ARIA Singles Chart at number 77, where after several weeks on the chart reached a peak position of number 25. The single debuted on the RIANZ Singles Chart on 30 November 2010 at number 32, eventually climbing to a peak of number five. On the week ending 1 January 2011, the Travie McCoy version of "Higher" debuted on the US Billboard Hot 100 at number 80, jumping 39 places to number 41 the following week. Five weeks later, the single reached a new peak of #24. The single also managed to debut on the UK Singles Chart at number 60 on 16 January 2011; climbing to number 37 the following week, based entirely on downloads of the album version alone. Following its full physical release, it ascended to its peak position of number eight. In the United Kingdom, the United States version of the song made Radio 1's B-Playlist while the single version (with Kylie Minogue) has made Radio 2's B-Playlist.

Formats and track listings
These are the formats and track listings of major single releases of "Higher".

 Digital download (Released: 10 November 2010, United Kingdom)
 "Higher" – 3:07

 Digital download (Released: 26 November 2010, Europe, Australia and Canada)
 "Higher" (featuring Kylie Minogue) – 3:07

 Digital download (Released: 13 December 2010, Brazil)
 "Higher" (featuring Kylie Minogue and Travie McCoy) - 3:22

 Digital download (Released: 20 December 2010, United States, Canada and Australia)
 "Higher" (featuring Travie McCoy) - 3:40

 German CD single (Released: 26 December 2010, Germany and France)
 "Higher" (featuring Kylie Minogue) - 3:09
 "Little Lion Man" (BBC Live Version) - 2:48

 Digital single
 "Higher" (Extended Mix) – 7:06
 "Higher" (Mixshow Edit) – 5:36

 Digital download - EP
 "Higher" (feat. Kylie Minogue & Travie McCoy) - 3:22
 "Higher" (feat. Travie McCoy) - 3:39
 "Higher" (DJ Wonder Remix) - 3:55
 "Higher" (7th Heaven Club Mix) - 6:31
 "Higher" (Club Junkies Remix) - 5:42

 The Remixes - Digital EP
 "Higher" (Jody Den Broeder Radio Mix) – 3:30
 "Higher" (Wideboys Radio Mix) – 3:39
 "Higher" (Ultimate High Radio Mix) – 3:42
 "Higher" (Jody Den Broeder Club Mix) – 6:18
 "Higher" (Wideboys Club Mix)  – 6:11
 "Higher" (Ultimate High Club Mix) – 6:32
 "Higher" (Jody Den Broeder Dub) – 6:03
 "Higher" (Wideboys Dub) – 6:11
 "Higher" (Ultimate High Dub) – 6:18

Charts

Weekly charts

Year-end charts

Certifications

Release history

See also
 List of number-one dance singles of 2011 (U.S.)

References

2010 singles
2011 singles
Kylie Minogue songs
Song recordings produced by Sandy Vee
Songs written by Taio Cruz
Songs written by Sandy Vee
Island Records singles